Keith Alan Byars (born October 14, 1963) is an American sports broadcaster and former professional football player. He was a fullback in the National Football League (NFL) for the Philadelphia Eagles, Miami Dolphins, New England Patriots and New York Jets.

Early life
Byars attended high school at the now-defunct Roth High School in Dayton, Ohio and Trotwood Madison High School, in Trotwood, Ohio.

College career
Byars was a tailback with the Ohio State Buckeyes from 1982 to 1985, under head coach Earle Bruce.

In 1984, Byars finished second in the Heisman Trophy voting (behind Doug Flutie) after a season where he gained an OSU record 2,441 all-purpose yards, including a then-school record 1,764 rushing yards and 22 touchdowns.  That season featured a game against Illinois (Ohio State won this game 45-38 on October 13, 1984) in which Byars led a comeback from a 24-0 deficit, rushing for 274 yards and five touchdowns, the last with 36 seconds remaining in the game. On his fourth touchdown run, going for 67 yards, he famously lost his left shoe at the Illini 40 but never broke stride.  Byars was a unanimous first-team All-America selection, and voted the Big Ten Conference Most Valuable Player.  His running backs coach that year was a young Jim Tressel, who would later become the Buckeyes' head coach.

Byars was a preseason favorite for the 1985 Heisman, but fractured the bone in his right foot near the little toe in preseason practice.  He missed the first five games of the 1985 season, and returned too early.  He reinjured the broken bone in his second game back and missed the remainder of the regular season.  He attempted to return for the Citrus Bowl game on December 28, but injured his foot again in the second Ohio State offensive series of the game.  Many observers note that throughout the remainder of his football career Byars was never as dominant a player as he had been in 1984. 

Despite losing almost his entire senior year, Byars finished his college career at Ohio State with 4,369 total yards, 3,200 rushing yards, and 50 touchdowns.  His 50 touchdowns remain the second most in school history.

Professional career
As a professional, he played fullback and tight end for the Philadelphia Eagles (1986–1992), Miami Dolphins (1993–1996), New England Patriots (1996–1997), and the New York Jets (1998). Byars was selected to the Pro Bowl in 1993.

A superb rusher, blocker, and pass receiver, Byars was a vital contributor for every team he played on. In 1988, he rushed for 517 yards, recorded 71 receptions (ranking him 9th in the NFL), and scored 10 touchdowns. In the Eagles' 20-12 loss to the Chicago Bears in the postseason, he rushed for 34 yards and caught 9 passes for 103 yards. In 1990, he recorded 81 receptions for 819 yards, the third most receptions in the NFL, rushed for 141 yards, and even completed 4 of 4 passes for 53 yards and 4 touchdowns. In the 1996 season, Byars made his first and only championship appearance, playing with the Patriots in Super Bowl XXXI. His team lost the game 35-21, but the 33-year-old Byars had a good performance in it, catching 4 passes for 42 yards and a touchdown.

Byars played one year as a member of the New York Jets in 1998. He helped the Jets reach the AFC Championship Game, before losing to the Denver Broncos in his last game played in the NFL.

In his 13 seasons, Byars rushed for 3,109 yards, caught 610 passes for 5,661 yards, returned five kickoffs for 94 yards, and completed 6 of 13 passes for 119 yards and six touchdowns, with one interception.  He also scored 54 touchdowns (23 rushing and 31 receiving).  His six passing touchdowns are the third highest total by a running back in NFL history. Byars 610 receptions are the 2nd most catches by a fullback and 4th most by a halfback/fullback/running back in NFL history of 2018.

After retirement
Keith Byars is currently co-hosting a sports radio show with ESPN 1410 WING-AM in Dayton, Ohio where he is from—Byars hosts the show with Justin Kinner on Sunday mornings (Sunday Morning Sports) from 9-11am and he also broadcasts High School football on 101.5 HANK-FM for the Greater Western Ohio Conference (GWOC). http://www.wingam.com/shows/sunday-morning-sports-justin-kinner/

He is currently a television analyst for "New York Football Weekly" and This Week in Football on the YES Network.

He also coached the Boca Raton High School varsity football team in Boca Raton, Florida from 2009 to September 2011.

See also
 List of NCAA major college football yearly rushing leaders
 List of NCAA major college football yearly scoring leaders

References

External links

1963 births
Living people
All-American college football players
American Conference Pro Bowl players
American football running backs
Miami Dolphins players
New England Patriots players
New York Jets players
Ohio State Buckeyes football players
Philadelphia Eagles players
Players of American football from Dayton, Ohio
Sports commentators
YES Network